Pacaso is a property broker that buys single-family homes and sells them to consortiums of buyers. The San Francisco–based company claims it reached unicorn status faster than any other USA-based company.

History
Austin Allison and Spencer Rascoff, ex-Zillow executives, co-founded the start-up in October 2020 in Silicon Valley, California.

Pacaso’s valuation rose to $1.5 billion in September 2021 following a $125 million funding round led by SoftBank Group. Other investors include Greycroft Partners and Global Founders Capital. Pacaso is reported to have separately obtained $1 billion in debt financing.

As of March 2022, the company is active in nearly 50 markets in the U.S., Spain, the U.K., and Mexico.

Business model
Pacaso operates by purchasing residential properties and then selling shares of the home to up to eight buyers. The company reports earning a twelve percent service fee on the sale of a share in addition to an ongoing monthly asset-management fee.

The organization claims that its model differs from the traditional timeshare model because purchases count as real estate acquisitions and appreciate in value. Buyers can sell their share after 12 months of ownership.

Pacaso's business model has been criticized as a way around anti-timeshare laws in northern California, and the company had to sell a house it had purchased in Napa after community opposition.

References

External links
Pacaso Official Site
Property Home Seller

American real estate websites
Companies based in San Francisco
Real estate services companies of the United States
Internet properties established in 2020